Šmejkal or Smejkal (feminine: Šmejkalová, Smejkalová) is a Czech surname. Derived from the verb smýkat ("to drag"), it originally meant a person with a limp. The name may refer to:

 Daniel Šmejkal (born 1970), Czech footballer
 Jan Smejkal (born 1946), Czech chess player
 Jiří Smejkal (born 1996), Czech ice hockey player
 Michal Smejkal (born 1986), Czech footballer 
 Rudolf Šmejkal (1915–1972), Czech footballer 
 Zdeněk Šmejkal (born 1988), Czech footballer

See also
 
 Smekal

References

Czech-language surnames